Fernando Sanjurjo (born 9 July 1982 in San Martín) is an Argentine football midfielder currently playing in Sportivo Patria.

Career

References

External links

1982 births
Living people
Argentine footballers
Argentine Primera División players
Expatriate footballers in Greece
Argentine expatriate sportspeople in Greece
Super League Greece players
Ferro Carril Oeste footballers
Defensores de Belgrano footballers
San Telmo footballers
River Plate (Asunción) footballers
Aris Thessaloniki F.C. players
PAS Giannina F.C. players
Diagoras F.C. players
C.D. Jorge Wilstermann players
Club Aurora players
C.D. Olmedo footballers
C.D. Técnico Universitario footballers
Association football midfielders
People from San Martín, Buenos Aires
Sportspeople from Buenos Aires Province